Suncity Records is an Australian record label that specialized in releasing melodic rock and hard rock CDs.  The label mostly focused on previously recorded, but unreleased, material. Suncity Records went out of business (off-line) in late 2010.

Artists
Androids
Big Guns
Blackboard Jungle
Blue Tears
Cruella D'ville
Dirty Rhythm
Fashion Police
Fatal Charm
Femme Fatale
Flash Addict
Jet Red
Johnny Crash
Kidd Havok
Lessdress
Daniel MacMaster (of Bonham)
Masque
Pretty Vacant
Quade
Road Ratt
Schoolboy Crush
Slash Puppet
Sweet Teaze
Swingin' Thing
Voyeur

See also
List of record labels

References

External links
Suncity Records website

Australian record labels
Rock record labels